MAPP or Mapp may refer to:

MAPP gas, a fuel for brazing and soldering torches
Mapp (surname)
MAPP (project), a research project from Free University of Bruxelles
 Mid-continent Area Power Pool, a part of the American Midwest Reliability Organization
Mapp Biopharmaceutical, manufacturers of ZMapp Ebola vaccine
Mapp and Lucia, a series of novels featuring Miss Mapp
 MAPP Property Management, managers of the Braehead Soar and Eldon Square Shopping Centres

See also
Mapp v. Ohio, American law case in criminal procedure

Map (disambiguation)